Carel Theodorus Scharten (March 14, 1878 – October 31, 1950) was a Dutch novelist and poet. He was born in Middelburg and died in Florence, Italy. In 1928 he and his wife Margo Scharten-Antink won a bronze medal in the art competitions of the Olympic Games for their "De nar uit Maremmen" ("The Fool from the Maremma").

References

External links
 profile 
 
 

1878 births
1950 deaths
Dutch male poets
Olympic bronze medalists in art competitions
People from Middelburg, Zeeland
Medalists at the 1928 Summer Olympics
Olympic competitors in art competitions